The 2016–17 Ukrainian Premier League season is the 26th top-level football club competitions since the fall of the Soviet Union and the ninth since the establishment of the Ukrainian Premier League. The league is scheduled to play its first 18 rounds before the winter break (10 December 2016 – 25 February 2017) finishing its first stage of tournament in March. The second stage is scheduled to start on 1 April 2017 and finish on 31 May 2017.

The league's title sponsor for 2016–17 season as for the previous season is a bookmaker company Parimatch, the title of which is displayed on the season shield.

With the continuation of the military conflict in the eastern oblasts (regions) of Ukraine since 2014 and the Russian occupation of Crimea (see the map), the league was forced to change its format again and will now be contested by 12 teams after being cut from 14 in the 2015–16 season.

Dynamo Kyiv were the defending champions. On 6 May 2017 in Kharkiv, Shakhtar Donetsk secured its 10th championship title with a win over Zorya Luhansk and four more rounds to play in the season. The 10th title that Shakhtar earned this season would allow the club to place a star on the club's crest to indicate this feat.

Changes and announcements
On 29 February 2016, the Ukrainian Premier League administration announced that there will be changes to the competition format for the 2016–17 season. It was confirmed that the championship would be played in two different phases, the first phase will be using a standard double round-robin tournament system and the second phase will be broken into two groups one from 1st to 6th place which will play for the championship and the European spots and the second group made up of teams from 7th place to 12th which will play to avoid relegation. The bottom two teams will be relegated and would be replaced by the champion and the runner-up of the 2016–17 Ukrainian First League. The points gained in the first stage are passed on to the second stage.

The new format was to be presented by the FFU Executive Committee. On 29 April 2016, the FFU Executive Committee approved the changes to the new UPL format for 2016–17 season. The fixtures were announced on 7 June 2016. The competition commenced on 21 July when Shakhtar Donetsk hosted Zirka Kropyvnytskyi in Lviv. The first eighteen rounds will be played before winter break which will begin after 10 December 2016. The competition is to resume 25 February 2017. The first phase will end on 18 March 2017 after which the league will split according to the first phase final standings with the second phase starting on 1 April 2017. The season will be concluded on 31 May 2017.

On 7 March 2017, the official website of Dynamo announced that the draw for the second stage of 2016–17 Ukrainian Premier League on 10 March 2017 at the VIP-lounge of Olympiyskyi NSC at 12:00 LST. On 10 March 2017 at Olimpiyskyi NSC took place a draw for the second stage of the tournament.

Teams

Promoted teams
Zirka Kropyvnytskyi – the champion of the 2015–16 Ukrainian First League (returning for the first time since 2003–04 season, 13 seasons absence).

Renamed teams
As part of ongoing decommunization in Ukraine, several populated places in Ukraine changed their names, therefore the league adopted the same changes and applied them to the respective clubs in parenthesis.
 FC Dnipro is shown as out of Dnipro.
 FC Stal Kamianske is shown as out of Kamianske.
 FC Zirka Kropyvnytskyi is shown as out of Kropyvnytskyi.

Location map

Stadiums
The following stadiums are regarded as home grounds:

Personnel and sponsorship

Managerial changes

Notes:

First stage

First stage table

First stage results

First stage positions by round
The following table represents the teams position after each round in the competition played chronologically.

Championship round

Championship round table

Championship round results

Championship round positions by round

Relegation round

Relegation round table

Relegation round results

Relegation round positions by round

Season statistics

Top goalscorers

The season top goalscorers were:

Hat-tricks

(number) Player scored (number) goals if more than 3

Awards

Monthly awards
On 16 November 2016, the Premier League administration announced start of voting for the Best player of the month.

Round awards
On 17 November 2016, the Premier League administration along with Pari-Match introduced another award, "Best player of the round". On 1 March 2017, the All-Ukrainian association of Football Coaches introduced award "Best coach of the round".

Season awards
The laureates of the 2016–17 UPL season were:
 Best player:  Andriy Yarmolenko (Dynamo Kyiv)
 Best coach:  Paulo Fonseca (Shakhtar Donetsk)
 Best goalkeeper:  Andriy Pyatov (Shakhtar Donetsk)
 Best arbiter:  Anatoliy Abdula (Kharkiv)
 Best young player:  Artem Dovbyk (FC Dnipro)
 Best goalscorer:  Andriy Yarmolenko (Dynamo Kyiv)

Scandals

FIFA sanctions
Number of sanctions were implemented by FIFA against some Ukrainian clubs due to their refuse to follow their contractual agreements with players and coaching staff.

In summer of 2016 FIFA imposed sanctions against FC Volyn Lutsk due to the "Ramon Lopes case" denying Volyn the right to register new players other than out of own academy (sport school). The sanctions were in place until 1 March 2017. On 24 February 2017 it became known that sanctions were extended to the end of season.

Separate and much bigger sanctions were implemented against FC Dnipro for number of instances among which are cases with Danilo Sousa Campos, Juande Ramos and others (see above). Before the winter break the club had 12 tournament points deducted, while more sanctions are anticipated to be introduced.

The FIFA sanctions were also implemented against FC Karpaty Lviv due to the "Semir Štilić case" (see above).

Other scandals
Previous agreement between Chornomorets and Zorya provided the Luhansk club with the Chornomorets home venue in Odessa for the 2016–17 UEFA Europa League. However the Odessa club failed to payback revenue to Zorya from tickets that were sold for the games. Zorya Luhansk took this case to court, while Chornomorets Odesa has paid portion of the debt already.

See also
 2016–17 Ukrainian First League
 2016–17 Ukrainian Second League
 2016–17 Ukrainian Cup
 List of Ukrainian football transfers summer 2016
 List of Ukrainian football transfers winter 2016–17

Notes

References

External links
 Current season on the Ukrainian Premier League website
 Season's regulations on 2016-17 season on the Ukrainian Premier League website
 News, stats, updates. campeones.ua.

Ukrainian Premier League seasons
1
Ukraine